Elachista contaminatella is a moth of the family Elachistidae that is found from France, Austria and Slovakia to the Iberian Peninsula, Sardinia and Sicily. It is also found in Bulgaria and Russia.

The larvae feed on Carex distans. They mine the leaves of their host plant.

References

External links
Lepiforum.de

contaminatella
Moths described in 1847
Moths of Europe